Carl Lewis Mickens (born August 2, 1960) is an American politician. He is a member of the Mississippi House of Representatives from the 42nd District, being first elected in 2015. He is a member of the Democratic party.

References

1960 births
Living people
People from Noxubee County, Mississippi
Democratic Party members of the Mississippi House of Representatives
21st-century American politicians